Stretton is a civil parish in the Borough of Warrington in Cheshire, England.  It contains nine buildings that are recorded in the National Heritage List for England as designated listed buildings, all of which are listed at Grade II.  This grade is the lowest of the three gradings given to listed buildings and is applied to "buildings of national importance and special interest".  The M56 motorway runs through the parish in an east–west direction, and the A49 road runs in a north–south direction.  The northern part of the parish is residential, and the rest is mainly rural.  Apart from St Matthew's Church and a milestone, the listed buildings are related either to houses or to farming.

References
Citations

Sources

Listed buildings in Warrington
Lists of listed buildings in Cheshire